Lineation may refer to:
 Lineation (handwriting), use of consistent spacing and letter size in Western handwriting to produce straight lines
 Lineation (geology), linear structural features within rocks
 Parting lineation
 Lineation (poetry), the selective arrangement of text into poetic lines

See also